Harry Mathew Kuntz (1929 – November 16, 1973) was a contractor for seismic drilling projects. He served as a politician in his late life, becoming the mayor of Camrose and later a Canadian federal politician from 1972 to 1973.

Kuntz began his political career by serving as mayor of Camrose, Alberta. He jumped to federal politics by running for a seat in the House of Commons of Canada in the 1972 federal election. Kuntz defeated three other candidates in a landslide. During his term in Parliament, he served on the Standing Committee on Transport and Communications and the Standing Committee on Indian Affairs and Northern Development. He died while still in office on November 16, 1973 at the age of 44.

References

External links
 

1973 deaths
Members of the House of Commons of Canada from Alberta
Progressive Conservative Party of Canada MPs
1929 births